Jan Bielecki (born 20 February 1971) is a Danish athlete. He competed in the men's hammer throw at the 1996 Summer Olympics and the 2000 Summer Olympics.

References

1971 births
Living people
Athletes (track and field) at the 1996 Summer Olympics
Athletes (track and field) at the 2000 Summer Olympics
Danish male hammer throwers
Olympic athletes of Denmark
Athletes from Copenhagen